Diphtheroptila oxyloga is a moth of the family Gracillariidae. It is known from South Africa and Zimbabwe.

The larvae feed on Bridelia species. They probably mine the leaves of their host plant.

References

Gracillariinae
Lepidoptera of South Africa
Lepidoptera of Zimbabwe
Moths of Sub-Saharan Africa